21 & Up is the debut album by rapper Lil Ru. It was released on August 25, 2009 through Def Jam Recordings.The album sold 1,456 copies in its first week.

Track listing

Charts 
Billboard

References 

2009 debut albums
Def Jam Recordings albums
Lil Ru albums